Mark XVI or Mark 16 often refers to the 16th version of a product, frequently military hardware. "Mark", meaning "model" or "variant", can be abbreviated "Mk." 

Mark XVI or Mark 16 can specifically refer to:

In technology

In military and weaponry
De Havilland Mosquito B Mk XVI, the most numerous Mosquito bomber variant with 1,200 built
De Havilland Mosquito PR Mk XVI, a photo-reconnaissance variant
Vickers Wellington C Mk XVI, a service conversion into an unarmed transport aircraft
Supermarine Spitfire Mk XVI (1943); identical to Spitfire Mk IX but with a licence-built Packard Merlin engine
Supermarine Spiteful F Mk 16; high speed Griffon-powered conversion of the Spitfire Mk XIV — two built
Bristol Hercules Mk XVI, a British 14-cylinder, 1675 hp radial aircraft engine
Bristol Taurus Mk XVI, a British 14-cylinder, 1130 hp radial aircraft engine
Mark 16 6-inch/47-caliber gun, US naval gun in triple mount configuration, used on light cruisers
Mark 16 torpedo (1945), common US Navy submarine anti-shipping torpedo in service until the mid-1970s
5"/54 caliber Mark 16 gun (1945), an American deck gun used by Japanese and US naval forces in the 1950s
Mark 16 nuclear bomb (1954); a large, experimental American weapon design that used cryogenic liquid deuterium as fusion fuel
QF 4 in (102 mm L/45) Mark XVI, a British naval quick-firing gun
CP Mk.XVI, a mounting for the BL 6 in L/45 Mark XII naval gun
Mark XVI, a British moored naval contact mine for laying in 100 fathoms or less
Colt Mk16 Mod 4 automatic cannon, derived from the Hispano-Suiza HS.404 for boats of the Mobile Riverine Force in Vietnam
Mk-16, a launcher for the naval RGM-84 Boeing Harpoon missile
FN SCAR-L, Mk 16 Mod 0, a 5.56mm assault rifle used by US Special Operations

Other uses
 Mark 16 or Mark XVI, the 16th and final chapter of the Gospel of Mark in the New Testament of the Christian Bible
 International Watch Company (IWC) Mark XVI, an automatic Pilot's watch introduced in 2006.